Prince Gardner was a state legislator in Alabama. He served in the Alabama House of Representatives in 1874 until he was unseated.

In 1872 he was documented as a teacher in Barbour County. He was a leader of the African Methodist Episcopal (A.M.E.) church in Russell County, Alabama. He served in the Alabama House of Representatives in 1874. representing Russell County, Alabama.

He and D. J. Daniels, an African American, were unseated. Petitioners contesting their election states that 1,500 of their votes were illegal. Allen E. Williams, Edward Odum, and Adam Gachet, representatives of Barbour County, Alabama, were also ousted from the Alabama House of Representatives.

He was a signatory on a Memorial of the Republican Members of the Legislature of Alabama to the Congress of the United States.

See also
Election Riot of 1874
African-American officeholders during and following the Reconstruction era

References

African-American politicians during the Reconstruction Era
Republican Party members of the Alabama House of Representatives
People from Russell County, Alabama
Year of birth uncertain
Year of death missing
African-American schoolteachers
19th-century African-American educators
19th-century American educators
Methodists from Alabama
Schoolteachers from Alabama
African Methodist Episcopal Church clergy
19th-century American Methodist ministers